The Men's 10 m platform competition of the 2016 European Aquatics Championships was held on 15 May 2016.

Results
The preliminary round was held at 10:00. The final was held at 15:30.

Green denotes finalists

References

Diving